Binocular O (majuscule: ,) is one of the exotic glyph variants of Cyrillic letter . This glyph variant can be found in certain manuscripts in the plural or dual forms of the root word eye, like .

A similar jocular glyph (called "double-dot wide O") has been suggested as a phonetic symbol for the "nasal-ingressive velar trill", a paralinguistic impression of a snort, due to the graphic resemblance to a pig snout.

Computing encodings

See also
 Monocular O
 Double monocular O
 Multiocular O

References

Eyes in culture
Grammatical number